Wilsonia is a small genus of New World warblers which breed in North America.  They are migratory, wintering south of their breeding ranges in Central America, the West Indies or South America.

The three species are:
 Hooded warbler, Wilsonia citrina
 Wilson's warbler, Wilsonia pusilla
 Canada warbler, Wilsonia canadensis

The hooded warbler is now included in Setophaga, while Wilson's and Canada are included in Cardellina.

They have yellow underparts and black head markings in at least the adult male plumage. Two species have plain olive green-brown back, but the Canada warbler has grey upperparts and is also migrates much further than the other species in the genus.

The breeding habitat is broadleaved woodlands with dense undergrowth. These birds nest low in a bush or on the ground, laying 3–6 eggs in a cup nest.

Wilsonia warblers feed on insects, often caught by flycatching, and they have distinctive songs and loud chip calls.

Taxonomy
Some authorities suggest that the genus Wilsonia should include the red-faced warbler, which is generally put in the genus Cardellina.

Recent genetic research has however suggested that the type species of Wilsonia (hooded warbler W. citrina) and of Setophaga (American redstart S. ruticilla) are closely related and should be merged into the same genus. As the name Setophaga (published in 1827) takes priority over Wilsonia (published in 1838), hooded warbler would then be transferred as Setophaga citrina. Where this is accepted, the other two Wilsonia species are then transferred to their next-most closely related genus, Cardellina. This change has been accepted by the North American Classification Committee of the AOU, and the IOC, however the South American Classification Committee of the AOU continues to keep Wilsonia in use.

This genus was named to commemorate the American ornithologist Alexander Wilson.

References

Parulidae
Bird genera
Obsolete bird taxa
Taxa named by Charles Lucien Bonaparte